Gillellus semicinctus, the half-banded stargazer, is a species of sand stargazer native to the Pacific coast of the Americas from the Gulf of California to Colombia, as well as occurring in the Galapagos Islands. It can reach a maximum length of  TL.

References

External links
 Photograph

semicinctus
Fish described in 1890